Grasă de Cotnari is a Romanian wine variety associated with the Cotnari wine region, in Iași County (historical region of Moldavia), where it has been grown ever since the rule of Prince Stephen the Great (1457–1504).

It is also grown in Tokaj-Hegyalja wine region of Hungary. The variety almost entirely disappeared from Tokaj after the phylloxera epidemic of the 19th century. 

Grape is characterized by its relatively large big berries.

Wine styles
Grasă de Cotnari is usually a botrytised sweet wine (although semi-sweet varieties are also made) and usually has a high residual sugar content, sometimes as much as 300g/liter. The harvest of 1958 reached the maximal sugar content in the history of this wine of about 520g/liter.

With the general decline in demand for sweet wines after the Second World War and bad wine making during the communist era, mainly produced for the Soviet Union, Grasă de Cotnari became largely forgotten in the international wine market. Even today it is seldom available, although the offered qualities have improved considerably.

The wine is made primarily from a grape variety also called Grasă de Cotnari. or Grasă (an old white grape cultivated in the Furmint group), although some additional Fetească Alba is allowed. It is produced from grapes that fully reached and exceeded their maturity, hence the high residual sugar content. It is suitable for making aszú wines in Hungary where it is called Kövérszőlő.

A carefully made Grasă de Cotnari is a golden yellow wine, and in spite of its residual sweetness should retain a fine acid structure and 11,5-14% alcohol by volume. It ages well, its color darkens from pale yellow to reach a dark yellow with an orange note in it.  A good Grasă de Cotnari should have a distinct bouquet of apricot, walnut and almond and should be drunk chilled at about 10-12 degrees Celsius.

Relationship to other grapes
The grape variety Grasa is known as Kövérszőlő in Tokaj, Hungary. These two grape varieties are identical.

External links
Cotnari Vineyard Website
About COTNARI
Cotnari Wine House of Iasi at agerpres.ro

References

White wine grape varieties
Moldavia
Noble rot wines
Grape varieties of Romania
Wineries of Romania